Maryamabad may refer to:
 Maryamabad, Golestan
 Maryamabad, Gujranwala
 Maryamabad, Hormozgan
 Maryamabad, Sheikhupura
 Maryamabad, Yazd